Dorian Kërçiku (born 30 August 1993 in Tirana) is an Albanian footballer who currently for Dinamo Tirana in the Albanian Superliga. He started his career with KF Tirana in 2011, but after only three appearances he moved to Skënderbeu Korçë where he would go on to win the Albanian Superliga title twice in two years before he moved back to KF Tirana in the summer of 2013 where he has since established himself as an important first team player.

Career

Early career
Kërçiku made his professional debut for KF Tirana in a Europa League second qualifying round game at home against Slovak side FC Spartak Trnava on 14 July 2011. Tirana's coach at the time Julián Rubio started Kërçiku in midfield and played him for the entire game, which ended in a goalless draw. He then played in the return fixture the following week in Slovakia where he once again started the game, but he was substituted off in 70th minute for Cameron Hepple in a game that ended in a 3–1 loss for KF Tirana. His next game was the 2011 Albanian Supercup against Skënderbeu Korçë where he started on the bench but was brought on at half time in the 1–0 win for KF Tirana thanks to a Bekim Balaj winner.

Skënderbeu
He left KF Tirana and signed for reigning Albanian Superliga champions Skënderbeu Korçë in the last few hours of the summer transfer window, and he was seen as the man to play behind striker Daniel Xhafa. He scored his first goal for the club on his first start against Shkumbini Peqin on 24 September 2011 in a 3–1 win where he opened the scoring in the 15th minute.

Return to Tirana
Shortly before the start of 2015–16 season, Kërçiku, when everyone thought he was going to leave, extended his contract for another season.

Career statistics

Honours

Club
Skënderbeu Korçë 
 Albanian Superliga: 2011–12. 2012-13

Tirana
Albanian First Division: 2017–18
Albanian Cup: 2016–17
Albanian Supercup: 2011, 2017

References

External links
Profile at Football Database

1993 births
Living people
Footballers from Tirana
Albanian footballers
Association football midfielders
Albania under-21 international footballers
Albania youth international footballers
KF Tirana players
KF Skënderbeu Korçë players
Kategoria Superiore players
Kategoria e Parë players